Patanjali Foods Ltd, formerly known as Ruchi Soya Industries Ltd, is a manufacturer of consumer packaged foods in India.

History 
Ruchi Soya Industries Limited was founded in 1986 by Dinesh Sahara, to manufacturer Soybean edible oil.

In January 2010, the company acquired a 50 percent stake in Gemini Edibles & Fats for 45 crore, until the whole company was purchased by the Widjaja family of Indonesia in 2014.

In December 2017, Ruchi Soya Industries entered into insolvency because of its total debt of about ₹12,000 crores. In December 2019, Patanjali Ayurved acquired the bankrupt Ruchi Soya for 4,350 crore.

In June 2021, Ruchi Soya acquired the biscuits and noodles business of Patanjali for 60 crore. It acquired the food business of Patanjali Ayurved for around 690 crore in May 2022. The company changed its name to Patanjali Foods in June 2022.

In 2023, SEBI froze promoters shares for failing to allow the minimum public shareholding in listed companies at 25%.

References

Companies based in Indore
Food and drink companies of India
Palm oil production in India
Patanjali Ayurved
Indian companies established in 1985
1985 establishments in Madhya Pradesh
Food and drink companies established in 1985
Companies listed on the National Stock Exchange of India
Companies listed on the Bombay Stock Exchange